Driving, when applied to horses, ponies, mules, or donkeys, is a broad term for hitching equines to a wagon, carriage, cart, sleigh, or other horse-drawn vehicle by means of a harness and working them in this way. It encompasses a wide range of activities from pleasure driving, to harness racing, to farm work, horse shows, and even international combined driving.

Styles
For horse training purposes, "driving" may also include the practice of long-lining (long reining), wherein a horse is driven without a cart by a handler walking behind or behind and to the side of the animal.  This technique is used in the early stages of training horses for riding as well as for driving.

Horses, mules and donkeys are driven in harness in many different ways.  For working purposes, they can pull a plow or other farm equipment designed to be pulled by animals.  In many parts of the world they still pull carts, wagons, horse-drawn boats or logs for basic hauling and transportation.  They may draw carriages at ceremonies, such as when the British monarch is Trooping the Colour, as well as in parades or for tourist rides.

Horses can race in harness, pulling a very lightweight one-person cart known as a sulky.  At the other end of the spectrum, some draft horses compete in horse pulling competitions, where single or teams of horses and their drivers vie to determine who can pull the most weight for a short distance.

In horse show competition, the following general categories of competition are seen:

Combined driving, an internationally recognized FEI competition where horses compete in one, two, and four-horse teams, pulling appropriately designed light carriages or carts.  They are expected to perform an arena-based "dressage" class where precision and control are emphasized, a cross-country "marathon" section that emphasizes fitness and endurance, and a "stadium" or "cones" obstacle course.
Draft horse showing:  Most draft horse performance competition is done in harness.  Draft horses compete in both single and multiple hitches, judged on manners and performance.
 Carriage driving, using somewhat larger two or four wheeled carriages, often restored antiques, pulled by a single horse, a tandem or four-in-hand team. Pleasure competitions are judged on the turnout/neatness or suitability of horse and carriage.
Pleasure driving, sometimes called Carriage driving in some nations:  Horses and ponies are usually hitched to a light, two-wheeled cart (four-wheeled fine harness carts are also seen, particularly at the highest levels of competition), and shown at a walk and two speeds of trot, with an emphasis on manners.  Nearly any breed of horse can be trained for pleasure driving.
Fine harness: Also called formal driving.  Horses are hitched to a light four-wheeled cart and shown in a manner that emphasizes flashy action and dramatic performance.  Refined pony breeds and certain light saddle horse breeds noted for their action are most often seen in fine harness.  Most fine harness competition requires horses to perform a bit of a walk, and two types of a high-action "park" trot, a slow trot with more controlled but elegant action, and a faster, flashier trot where the horse exhibits the most animation possible, often announced by the command "show your horses" (or "show your ponies" in the case of pony shows).
Roadster: A horse show competition, usually for ponies, (a few light horse breeds also offer roadster classes), where exhibitors wear racing silks and ride in a sulky in a style akin to harness racing, only without actually racing, but rather focusing on manners and performance.  Roadsters are shown at two types of trot, known as road gait and at speed.

Teams

A team is more than one animal used together for draft.  The animals may be arranged in various ways.   While a single animal is usually placed between two shafts, a pair (two animals) is usually hitched side by side with a single pole between them.  A troika is a team hitched in a single row of three: the center horse in shafts and each of the other two hitched on either side.  A tandem hitch has one rear animal in shafts, then one or more others hitched ahead of the first in single file.

Larger teams are usually in pairs, with four, six or even more animals overall; driving these is known as driving four-in-hand, six-in-hand etc.  Sometimes other arrangements are used, such as the "unicorn" (one animal in front of a pair), and the "pickaxe" (three animals in front of a pair).  Teams larger than six are generally limited to situations where large loads must be hauled over difficult ground.  For example, eight-ox plowing teams were once common on the heavy soils of southern England, as were very large ox teams used in 19th century South Africa (see ox-wagon).  Twenty-mule teams were used in the mid-19th century for hauling ore in California, and large teams of horses were often needed to pull the heaviest types of horse artillery.

The animals in a large team have different tasks.  The wheelers are the pair (or in tandem, the single animal) closest to the vehicle.  They provide the main braking effort, slowing the vehicle and controlling it downhill by pulling back on the pole or shafts.  The strength of the wheelers is often the limiting factor in determining the maximum safe load for a vehicle – while all the animals can pull uphill, only the wheelers can hold the vehicle downhill.  For this reason, the strongest pair in a team may be chosen as the wheelers.  Wheelers also steer the vehicle by turning the pole or shafts.

The leaders are all the animals in front of the wheelers.  As they are also in front of the pole or shafts they cannot provide any braking effort.

Wheelers and leaders in a team usually have somewhat different harness: wheelers usually have breeching so they can pull back on the shafts or pole; leaders do not need breeching, and nor do animals pulling a dragged load such as a plow (where all the animals are effectively leaders).  Wheelers may not need breeching in very light vehicles, or those with efficient brakes.

Historically, very heavy loads were sometimes controlled downhill by additional pairs hitched behind the vehicle.  Such additional pairs were often hired to passing vehicles to help them either up or down a particularly steep hill.

A particular pair of horses are often worked together all the time.  They also may often be hitched the same way as well – each animal always placed on the right-hand or left-hand side.  Traditionally, pairs are often given paired names, as in the well-known example of the names of Santa Claus's reindeer: Dasher and Dancer, Prancer and Vixen, Comet and Cupid, Donner and Blitzen.

History

While there is some anthropological evidence that horses were ridden before they were driven, the most unequivocal evidence of domestication and use of the horse as a driving animal are the Sintashta chariot burials in the southern Urals, circa 2000 BC. However, shortly thereafter, the expansion of the domestic horse throughout Europe was little short of explosive.  In the space of possibly 500 years, there is evidence of horse-drawn chariots in Greece, Egypt, and Mesopotamia. By another 500 years, the horse-drawn chariot had spread to China.

Horses may have been driven even earlier.  The Standard of Ur, in ancient Sumer, c. 2500 BC, shows horses or some type of onager or donkey hitched to wheeled carts with a yoke around their necks, in a manner similar to that of oxen.

By the time of the Hyksos invasions of Egypt, c. 1600 BC, horses were pulling chariots with an improved harness design that made use of a breast collar and breeching, which allowed a horse to move faster and pull more weight.  The breastcollar style harness is still used today for pulling lightweight vehicles.

Even after the chariot had become obsolete as a tool of war, there still was a need for technological innovations in pulling technologies as larger horses were needed to pull heavier loads of both supplies and weapons.  The invention of the horse collar in China during the 5th century (Southern and Northern Dynasties) allowed horses to pull greater weight than they could when hitched to a vehicle by means of the ox yokes or breast collars used in earlier times. The horse collar arrived in Europe during the 9th century, and became widespread throughout Europe by the 12th century.

With the invention of the automobile, the tractor and other internal combustion vehicles, the need for driving horses diminished, beginning with the end of World War I and to an even greater degree after World War II. However, interest in driving competition for horses continued, with the horse show and harness racing worlds keeping interest alive, and the development of the sport of combined driving continued to refine the art of proper training and driving techniques.  In addition, many third world nations retain a need for driving horses for basic farm work and transportation.

See also

 Draft horse
 Driving club
Equestrianism
Horse harness
Horse and buggy
Working equitation

References

Equestrianism